Hektor Frashëri was the minister for justice for Albania in the 1992 government of Sali Berisha. He is a member of the Democratic Party.

References 

Possibly living people
Year of birth missing
Democratic Party of Albania politicians
Government ministers of Albania
Justice ministers of Albania